Francisco Fernández Miranda (born 21 June 1986) is a Spanish water polo player. He was part of the Spanish team at the 2016 Summer Olympics, where the team finished in seventh place.

See also
 List of World Aquatics Championships medalists in water polo

References

External links
 

1986 births
Living people
Sportspeople from Madrid
Spanish male water polo players
Olympic water polo players of Spain
Water polo players at the 2016 Summer Olympics
Mediterranean Games silver medalists for Spain
Mediterranean Games medalists in water polo
Competitors at the 2013 Mediterranean Games
Spanish people of Angolan descent
Spanish sportspeople of African descent
Water polo players at the 2020 Summer Olympics
Water polo players from the Community of Madrid
21st-century Spanish people